Maybelline Masuda is a Filipino Brazilian Jiu-Jitsu practitioner.  She has earned the Philippines prestige by winning and becoming the first Filipino Brazilian Jiu-Jitsu World Champion as a white belt in 2009 and for winning the Country's 1st ever gold medal at the Asian Beach Games for Ju Jitsu in 2014.

Early life
Maybelline Masuda was born in Calamba, Laguna. Her mother, Victoria Constantino is a native of Quezon and her father, Douglas Masuda is a Japanese-American from California who is a retired lawyer and an Elvis Tribute Artist, known as the Elvis of Japan.

Career
At age 15, Masuda was introduced to the Filipino martial art of Yaw-Yan and later joined a Yaw-Yan Buhawi Vale Tudo tournament where she won a gold medal. At age 18, during her 3rd year in college at De La Salle University Manila, she was encouraged by a friend to join a Brazilian Jiu-Jitsu class held in school and led by URCC MMA Champion Allan Co and DEFTAC Philippines coach Pichon Garcia, due to her prior experience in Yaw-Yan. They eventually invited her to train and join the team Deftac in 2008, where she met Alvin Aguilar, the first home-grown Filipino  Brazilian jiu-jitsu 1st degree blackbelt and founder of the URCC. With Hard work and dedication, she further developed her special talent in Jiu Jitsu under his guidance.

As a white belt, Masuda won the lightfeather weight title at the 2009 World Brazilian Jiu-Jitsu Championships, becoming the first Filipino to win a title at the tournament.

In 2012, she was promoted to purple belt by her mentor Aguilar which made her the first Filipina Purple belt in Brazilian jiu-jitsu.

She is among the two who brought home the first gold medals for the Philippines at the Asian Beach Games during the 2014 edition in Phuket, Thailand. She won a medal in Ju-jitsu in the -50 kg category beating Le Thu Trang Dao of Vietnam in the gold medal match. The other one who bagged the other gold medal following her victory  was Annie Ramirez also a jiu-jitsu practitioner.

On September 21, 2016, she was promoted and became the first home-grown Filipina brown belt.
On June 30, 2018, she was promoted and became the first homegrown Filipina black belt

External links
Maybelline Masuda 2014 Asian Beach Games Profile

References

1989 births
Filipino practitioners of Brazilian jiu-jitsu
Female Brazilian jiu-jitsu practitioners
Filipino jujutsuka
People from Calamba, Laguna
Sportspeople from Laguna (province)
Filipino people of Japanese descent
Living people
De La Salle University alumni